Redmine is a free and open source, web-based project management and issue tracking tool. It allows users to manage multiple projects and associated subprojects. It features per project wikis and forums, time tracking, and flexible, role-based access control. It includes a calendar and Gantt charts to aid visual representation of projects and their deadlines. Redmine integrates with various version control systems and includes a repository browser and diff viewer.

The design of Redmine is significantly influenced by Trac, a software package with some similar features.

Redmine is written using the Ruby on Rails framework. It is cross-platform and cross-database and supports 49 languages.

Features

Redmine's features include the following:

 Allows tracking of multiple projects
 Supports flexible role-based access control
 Includes an issue tracking system
 Features a Gantt chart and calendar
 Integrates News, documents and files management
 Allows Web feeds and e-mail notifications.
 Supports a per-project wiki and per-project forums
 Allows simple time tracking
 Includes custom fields for issues, time-entries, projects and users
 Supports a range of SCM integration, including (SVN, CVS, Git, Mercurial, Bazaar and Darcs)
 Supports multiple LDAP authentication
 Allows user self-registration
 Supports 49 languages
 Allows multiple databases
 Allows for plugins
 Provides a REST API

Adoption
, there were more than 80 major Redmine installations worldwide. Among the users of Redmine is Ruby. In 2015, Redmine was the most popular open source project planning tool.

Forks
Following concerns with the way the feedback and patches from the Redmine community were being handled a group of Redmine developers created a fork of the project in February 2011. The fork was initially named Bluemine, but changed to ChiliProject. After the leader of the fork moved on from ChiliProject in 2012 and development and maintenance had been announced to shut down, the project was officially discontinued in February 2015.

Another fork of ChiliProject called OpenProject is active since 2015.

See also

 Comparison of issue-tracking systems
 Comparison of project management software
 Comparison of time-tracking software
 Software configuration management

References

Sources

External links
 

Task management software
Bug and issue tracking software
Free project management software
Project management software
Free wiki software
Cross-platform free software
Free software programmed in Ruby
2006 software